Isidoro León Becerra (January 4, 1911 – July 25, 2002) was a Major League Baseball pitcher who played for the Philadelphia Phillies in 1945.  The 34-year-old rookie was a native of Cruces, Cuba.

León is one of many ballplayers who only appeared in the major leagues during World War II. He made his major league debut on June 21, 1945, in a home game against the Brooklyn Dodgers at Shibe Park. He was the starting and losing pitcher in a 9–2 defeat. Cy Buker was the winning pitcher. León's final big league appearance was on September 16. He was released by Philadelphia on February 26, 1946.

Season and career totals include 14 games pitched, 4 starts, 0 complete games, a 0–4 record with 4 games finished, 23 earned runs allowed in 38 innings, and an ERA of 5.35.

In 1948, he played for the New York Cubans of the Negro National League.

León died at the age of 91 in Miami, Florida.

References

External links

1911 births
2002 deaths
People from Cruces, Cuba
Major League Baseball pitchers
Major League Baseball players from Cuba
Cuban expatriate baseball players in the United States
Philadelphia Phillies players
Abilene Blue Sox players
Dublin Green Sox players
Havana Cubans players
Minneapolis Millers (baseball) players
Portland Beavers players
Sherman–Denison Twins players
St. Petersburg Saints players